Vjera Mujović (Serbian Cyrillic: Вјера Мујовић ) is a Serbian actress. She is from the Vasojevici clan, and is known for her work in theatre but also in television. She has also written several books

Biography 
Mujović was born in Podgorica, Montenegro. She studied at the Faculty of Dramatic Arts in Belgrade. 

She has appeared in television series and in films. Mujović has worked in theatre and in films across Europe including in Russia, Ukraine, Sweden, and France.

Mujović recorded Viens, mini CD in Serbian and French, and Why, a CD of Russian songs. She has published two books: The Register of Beds, Longings, and Warnings, and a I Haven’t Imagined such a Life, and a theatre play Cherries in Chocolate. 

She is the recipient of numerous awards including a Golden Knight in Moscow, and Zvaigzne in Riga (Latvia), awards at the Moscow Festival of Russian classics. She was awarded a doctorate for her treatise on Cultural Diplomacy by Singidunum University in 2019.

Vjera Mujović is an acclaimed actress at the National Theatre in Belgrade.

Filmography 

 Baby Doll, short film, D.Varda
 The Esqiman Maiden's Romance, short film
 Gidra, Ginis film, G.Zurli	
 Vladimir and Kosara, TV Montenegro, S.Divanovic
 The World, TV Serbia, D.Corkovic
 Julia, TV clip, FRZ Belgrade, M.Pavlovic
 Give me the Truth, Art Channel, Varda
 Two Hours of Good Quality Broadcasting, Third Channel, S. Dragojevic
 Imaginations, ART Channel, D.Varda
 The Originals, TV Montenegro,Z.Nikolic
 Kolibas, BK TV, M.Marinkovic
 Molinos, Lenfilm, M.Bodin
 Good Night, RTS, R.Lukic
 The roofs, the Bombs and Pushkin, TV Kazakhstan, A Scherbakov
 Le Biftec, Noria Film, F. Verreccia
 Spleen, L.Barbieri (best Italian Short Film 2004.)
 Bear in the Big Blue House
 Mina, RTS, V. Nedanovski
 My cousin from countryside, RTS, M.Marinkovic

Theatre roles 

She played the role of Sleeping Beauty and in Alice in Wonderland, Janis Wickery, Sonetchka Holiday by Marina Cvetaeva, Mogley from the Jungle Book, Judith, the Byzantine Princess Yevdokiya to Vladimir Nabokov's Lolita, Lena from Bergman's Autumn Sonata, Aglaya in Dostoevsky's The Idiot, Sylvia Plath and Madame de Tourvel in Dangerous Liasiouns.

Publications

Cultural Diplomacy in the Service of Serbia, published by the Institute for Political Studies Belgrade, 2020 (367pp) (her doctoral dissertation of May 2019 at the Faculty of Media and Communications, Singidunum University, Belgrade, Serbia).

External links 

 Vjera Mujović at the site of National Theatre in Belgrade

21st-century Serbian actresses
Living people
Actors from Podgorica
Serbs of Montenegro
University of Belgrade Faculty of Dramatic Arts alumni
Serbian film actresses
Serbian stage actresses
Year of birth missing (living people)